Rose Henderson  (1871–1937) was a Canadian political activist and social reformer.

Personal life 
Rose Mary Louise Wills was born on 14 December 1871 in Dublin, Ireland to middle-class parents of English ancestry. She moved to Canada in 1885 as a teenager. She married Charles Henderson, though the date and location of the marriage are unknown. The couple had a daughter, Ida, who was born in 1890 in Quebec. Rose's husband, Charles, died at Royal Victoria Hospital, Montreal in January 1904. There is no evidence showing that Henderson was politically active before her husband's death.

In 1911 Henderson converted to the Baháʼí Faith.

Political career 
After Charles's death, Rose Henderson became an activist and social reformer on behalf of Montreal's working class districts. In 1912 Henderson was appointed as a probation officer for the juvenile court. She unsuccessfully ran for Parliament of Canada in 1921 and 1925. She was a member of the Women's International League for Peace and Freedom and in 1936 participated in the World Peace Conference. Henderson contributed to the development of feminist thought distinct from first wave and second wave feminism.

She published Kids what I knows, a collection of poetry and short stories inspired by the children she worked with.

Death 
Henderson died on 30 January 1937.

References

1871 births
1937 deaths
People from County Dublin
Irish emigrants to Canada (before 1923)
Activists from Montreal
Canadian suffragists
Canadian socialists
Baháʼí feminists
Canadian socialist feminists
Canadian feminists